Lebanon participated in the 2007 Asian Winter Games held in Changchun, China from January 28, 2007 to February 4, 2007. This country was represented by 1 athlete in the snowboarding competition.

Snowboarding

References

Nations at the 2007 Asian Winter Games
Asian Winter Games
Lebanon at the Asian Winter Games